Out of the Present is a 1995 documentary film by Andrei Ujică that deals with the prolonged stay of the Russian cosmonaut Sergei Krikalev at space station Mir. This was the first time a 35 mm film camera was used in space.

Synopsis 
The film begins with the May 1991 docking of Soyuz TM-12 at the station. For 92 minutes (the time for one Earth-orbit of the station) the routine of a long-term space station crew is shown, frequently interrupted by panoramic Earth views in addition to observing the day-to-day activities of eating, exercising and conducting experiments in weightlessness. Krikalev was a bystander to the 1991 Soviet coup d'état attempt and the collapse of the Soviet Union during his 10-month stay.

The arrival of Soyuz TM-13 is a highlight, while the station was crowded with five cosmonauts for a week. Due to the then-current political situation in Kazakhstan, a Kazakh cosmonaut, Toktar Aubakirov, had been selected for this mission. Without long-term training he was unable to relieve Krikalev, who therefore had to stay another six months at the station. Finally, Krikalev is shown back on Earth, resting on a couch after more than 300 days in zero gravity.

Production 
The filming was handled mainly by the long-term crews of the Mir. It is said that simply transporting the film camera used up roughly half of the film's budget.

References

External links 
 
 Out of the Present at filmportal.de
 Out of the Present at Space Place
 Out of the Present at variety.com

German documentary films
1995 films
Space program of the Soviet Union
Mir
Films about astronauts
1990s German films